Istanbul University-Cerrahpaşa is a public university which was formed in Istanbul on 18 May 2018. It takes its name from Cerrah Mehmed Pasha, who gave its name to the Cerrahpaşa, Fatih district in Istanbul. It has nine faculties, six Institutes, one college, five Vocational schools and ten research centers. The rectorate of the university, which has 8 campuses, is located in Avcılar. In addition, the university provides education in two languages, Turkish and English.

History 
Istanbul University, in fact, has long since become a comprehensive system more than a university in simple terms: Two of the most prominent medical schools of Turkey were under this university, there are more than one school of same type based on different mentality and aim for economics, business administration, political science etc. An opinion gave rise that separating the system into two would be more effective to manage all the services and in 2018, Istanbul University has been divided into two, one is Istanbul University and the other is Istanbul University, Cerrahpaşa.

The separation has been made by taking the location properties and functionalities into consideration:
 The first modern medical school of Turkey, Istanbul Medical School, also known as "Çapa" leads the first separation and those units located on Çapa, Beyazıt, Vezneciler and some other units remains under the Istanbul University system, istanbul.edu.tr.
 Cerrahpaşa Medical School leads the new separation and those units located on Cerrahpaşa, Avcılar, Sarıyer and some other units form that new separation as Istanbul University, Cerrahpaşa, istanbulc.edu.tr.
 Functionality properties have been also another criterion. For instance, one medical school is under one while the other is under the other, some of the several schools on liberal arts and economics are under one while the others are under the other etc.
 Unlike the University of California system, those two separations are, literally, two distinct universities. There are no chancellors being responsible to a superior president. Both of them have established their own presidencies.

The faculties of the university have a long history. Cerrahpaşa Faculty of Medicine was established in 1827.

Campuses 
The university has 8 campuses. These:

Notable alumni 

 Moshe Arditi, medical researcher and academic,  Cedars-Sinai Medical Center and UCLA
 Fahrettin Koca, Minister of Health of the 66th government of Turkey.
 Mehmet Müezzinoğlu, Turkish politician
 Nevzat Tarhan, Turkish medical scientist

See also 

 Istanbul University
 List of universities in İstanbul
 List of universities in Turkey

References

External links 
 Istanbul University, Cerrahpaşa Official Website (In English)

Universities and colleges in Turkey
Educational institutions established in 2018
2018 establishments in Turkey
Buildings and structures in Istanbul